Stephen McKenna (sometimes signing as SMCK) (20 March 1939 – 4 May 2017) was a British-born visual artist known for his postmodern figurative paintings. He was shortlisted for the Turner Prize in 1986. His works can be seen in the collections of the Tate Galleries, the British Council, the Imperial War Museum, London, and has been shown at various galleries including the Royal Hibernian Academy, Dublin and the Irish Museum of Modern Art. He was a member of the Royal Hibernian Academy.

Life
McKenna was born in London, he studied there at Slade School of Art (affiliated to the University College London). In 1973 he moved to Donegal, Ireland. He has also lived in Belgium, Germany, and Italy. He was a guest professor at Hochschule für Bildende Künste Braunschweig (Brunswick, Germany) from 1995 to 1996. In 1997 he curate the exhibition The Pursuit of Painting at the Irish Museum of Modern Art. He became an associate member of the RHA in 2001 and a full member in 2002 and was the president of this association from 2005 till 2009.

He died in his home in County Carlow on 4 May 2017.

Notable works
O, Ilium! (1982) is an example of postmodern pastiche, combining imagery from classical art and sculpture, Max Ernst, Constantin Brâncuși, and archaic Greek pottery. According to an Ingeborg Hoesterey, it throws together images from the cultural memory of western civilisation, showing them to constitute only a "wasteland".

Exhibitions
Solo exhibitions of his work include:
 Museum of Modern Art, Oxford (1983)
 Van Abbemuseum, Eindhoven (1983)
 Stephen McKenna Paintings 1985–1993, Irish Museum of Modern Art, Dublin (1993)

References

External links
 Represented by Kerlin Gallery, Dublin

1939 births
2017 deaths
20th-century English painters
21st-century English painters
People from Ashford, Surrey
Alumni of the Slade School of Fine Art
English contemporary artists